Women's police stations (also units or offices) – ,  – are police stations specializing in crimes with female victims. They were first introduced in 1985 in Brazil and are numerous in Latin America. According to Latin American Perspectives, the first women's police station was opened in Sao Paulo, Brazil and "In the first six months of operation, the DDM processed 2,083 reports."

Officers at these stations are only allowed to respond to certain crimes, such as psychological violence, domestic violence, family violence, as well as specific types of threats and sexual violence.  Some units offer financial help, counseling, and medical care for women who are having trouble.

In India, a study found "the establishment of 188 women's police stations resulted in a 23 percent increase in reporting of crimes against women and children and a higher conviction rate between 2002 and 2004". A 2020 study found that women who lived near women's police stations in Brazil had higher trust in the police. A 2020 study found that the implementation of all-women's police stations in India had counterproductive impacts on victims of gender-based violence.

Aim 
Women's police stations are located in mostly Latin American countries where rates of rape and violence against women are high. Americasquarterly.org states, "Femicide—the killing of women—has reached alarming levels in Latin America.  The most recent region-wide statistics available, from 2003, show that seven Latin American countries score among the worst 10 nations when measuring the rate of femicide per one million women in 40 countries." Women's police stations are also in Ghana, India, Pakistan, Kosovo, Liberia, Nicaragua, Peru, Sierra Leone, South Africa, Uganda and Uruguay. A policewoman at a station in Pakistan states, "Even if a woman is being beaten and psychologically tortured, she's told to consider her husband's honor and not go to the police station." Some women in Latin America do not even know their rights, Endvawow.org states, "Only in Brazil had a majority of women surveyed receiving training or information about their rights one or more times (by any source): 54% in Brazil, 42% in Nicaragua, 34% in Peru, and 23% in Ecuador." According to Hautzinger in her article Criminalising Male Violence in Brazil's Women's Police Stations, in Salvador, Brazil in regular police stations in spousal violence cases less than 2% actually went to court and the punishments the men did get were very minor. Endvawnow states that women police stations are an important first step for crimes to enter the justice system.

Results 
Women's police stations have greatly expanded since 1985. Endvawnow.org states, "In 2010, there were 475 WPS in Brazil, 34 in Ecuador, 59 in Nicaragua, and 27 in Peru." In Santos' article EN-GENDERING THE POLICE states, "They [women's police stations] expanded victims' citizenship rights, allowing them to denounce a violence that not long ago was invisible and considered a private matter. In 2000, for example, 310,058 complaints of violence against women were registered in the women's police stations of Sao Paulo." Language barriers and the inability to get to a station is still a problem. According to Endvawnow.org, women's police stations are located in more populated areas making it hard for women in rural areas to get to them and women who do not speak the same language as the policewomen can not communicate effectively. Endvawnow.org also states "It was also found that poor and less educated women are sometimes ignored in the WPS. Also, despite psychological violence being illegal in all four countries, operators frequently prioritise those cases in which women have severe visible physical injuries, and may resist accepting complaints of psychological violence."

See also

Women-only space
Women's shelter

References

Feminism and health
Gender-related violence
Misogyny
Violence against women in Brazil
Police stations
Police station